Matthew Morison (born April 9, 1987) is a Canadian amateur Snowboarder who currently resides in Kamloops, British Columbia. Morison has qualified to compete at the 2010 Winter Olympics in Vancouver, British Columbia. Matthew, a native of Burketon, Ontario began snowboarding at the Oshawa Ski Club at a young age. By Age 11, Morison was already beating senior men in races. Matthew competes in Alpine disciplines, Parallel GS and Parallel Slalom. He attended Courtice Secondary School.

Matthew was featured in the MTV Canada series 'Summer Sessions' alongside fellow national riders like Jasey-Jay Anderson and Michael Lambert. He also featured in the follow-up MTV show Over the Bolts which followed the Canadian national team over the season.

Matthew finished the 2007–08 season ranked 4th overall in the FIS Snowboard World Cup, in the 2008–09 season he ranked 6th overall. He has reached the podium nine separate occasions at World Cup races including three Parallel GS golds in Limone Piemonte, Italy, Valmalenco, Italy, and Furano, Japan. Matt won a bronze at the 2009 FIS World Championships, the bronze was Morison's first world championship medal.

References

External links
 
 

Canadian male snowboarders
Snowboarders at the 2010 Winter Olympics
Snowboarders at the 2014 Winter Olympics
1987 births
Living people
Olympic snowboarders of Canada
Sportspeople from Oshawa